Juán Agripino Landolfi (born 23 June 1914, date of death unknown) was an Argentine professional football player. He also held Italian citizenship. Landolfi is deceased.

References

1914 births
Year of death missing
Argentine footballers
Newell's Old Boys footballers
Serie A players
Serie B players
S.S.D. Lucchese 1905 players
Inter Milan players
Calcio Padova players
U.S. Avellino 1912 players
Association football defenders
Argentine emigrants to Italy
Footballers from Córdoba, Argentina